Richard Gay (born 6 March 1971) is a French freestyle skier and Olympic medalist. He received a bronze medal at the 2002 Winter Olympics in Salt Lake City, in moguls.

References

External links 
 

1971 births
Living people
French male freestyle skiers
Freestyle skiers at the 2002 Winter Olympics
Olympic bronze medalists for France
Olympic medalists in freestyle skiing
Medalists at the 2002 Winter Olympics
Université Savoie-Mont Blanc alumni